Michael Cooke may refer to:
Michael Cooke (footballer) (born 1953), Australian rules footballer
Michael Cooke (journalist) (born 1953), Canadian journalist and publishing executive
Michael George Cooke, American academic. 
Mick Cooke (born 1973), musician
Mick Cooke (Australian footballer)
Mick Cooke (football manager) (born 1951), Irish association football manager and player

See also
Michael Cook (disambiguation)